The Watsonville Traction Company or Watsonville Transportation Company was a  narrow gauge, interurban electrified railway in California.

Origin

Watsonville was served by the Southern Pacific railroad, but local businessmen felt they could secure more favorable rates if they had a seaport. A  electric railway line was built from Main Street in Watsonville along Wall Street to a wharf constructed from the shore of Monterey Bay at Port Rogers. A power station, car barn, and freight warehouse were built on Beach Road where the electric line crossed the similarly narrow gauge Pajaro Valley Consolidated Railroad; but there was little cause to interchange cars because the steam railroad served its own wharf at Moss Landing. The electric railroad had two street cars serving the dual purpose of carrying passengers and pulling some of the railroad's two boxcars and four flatcars.

1904 & 1905
The 997-ton passenger-carrying steam schooner F.A.Kilburn was built by Hans Ditlev Bendixsen of Fairhaven, California, to operate as a produce packet between the wharf and San Francisco. Kilburn's maiden voyage in May 1904 brought seventy passengers from San Francisco to meet the electric cars at Port Rogers. Regular scheduling had the Kilburn leave Port Rogers in the early evening to arrive in San Francisco the following morning in time for the early market, where it became known as the berry boat. Within a few months of initiating service the wharf at Port Rogers required replacement of timbers damaged by teredo worms. Heavy seas damaged the wharf soon after the damaged timbers had been replaced with redwood. The total cost of repairs was $35,000; and the company declared bankruptcy on 8 September 1905.

1911 to 1913
The company was reorganized as the Watsonville Railway and Navigation Company on 22 April 1911 with Port Rogers renamed Port Watsonville. The rolling stock was stored while service was discontinued through the bankruptcy proceedings, and one of the two streetcars had been destroyed by fire in 1909. The berry boat had run aground off Coos Bay while being operated in coastal trade by stockholder Fred Linderman, but was towed to North Bend, Oregon to receive a new rudder and a patch for the holed hull. The railroad resumed operation with the streetcar and ten flatcars, which were often fitted with benches for carrying additional passengers to various entertainment events on Monterey Bay beaches. The company was unable to pay for repairs after a December 1912 storm destroyed 160 feet of the wharf; so operations ceased in October 1913. The repaired berry boat went through a series of owners before burning off American Shoal Light on 14 June 1918.

References

 

3 ft gauge railways in the United States
Defunct California railroads
Interurban railways in California
Watsonville, California